Colliflower is a surname. Notable people with the surname include:

George Colliflower (1886–1980), American basketball player and coach
Harry Colliflower (1869–1961), American baseball pitcher

See also
Gorenflo